Gerontius (Latinized Greek for 'old man') can refer to:

Music and literature 
 The Dream of Gerontius, a 1900 choral work by Edward Elgar, a setting of a poem of the same name by John Henry Newman
 The Dream of Gerontius, the poem by John Henry Newman

People 
 Gerontius (bishop of Milan), bishop of Milan (462-465)
 Gerontius of Cervia, 6th-century Italian bishop
 Gerontius, Metropolitan of Moscow, 1473-1489
 Gerontius (magister militum), early 5th-century Roman general
 Gerontius (commander), early 4th-century Roman commander of Tomis

Fiction 
 Gerontius, a 1989 novel by James Hamilton-Paterson
 Gerontius, the given name of the Old Took, a hobbit mentioned in J. R. R. Tolkien's fantasy series The Lord of the Rings

See also
Geraint (given name) (the Welsh form of Gerontius)

Masculine given names